Zastarze  is the part of Dziecinów  village, Gmina Sobienie-Jeziory, Poland. From 1975 to 1998 this place was in Siedlce Voivodeship.

Villages in Otwock County